Venn  is a surname and a given name. It may refer to:

Given name
 Venn Eyre (died 1777), Archdeacon of Carlisle, Cumbria, England
 Venn Pilcher (1879–1961), Anglican bishop, writer, and translator of hymns
 Venn Young (1929–1993), New Zealand politician

Surname
 Albert Venn (1867–1908), American lacrosse player
 Anne Venn (1620s–1654), English religious radical and diarist
 Blair Venn, Australian actor
 Charles Venn (born 1973), British actor
 Harry Venn (1844–1908), Australian politician
 Henry Venn (Church Missionary Society) the younger (1796-1873), secretary of the Church Missionary Society, grandson of Henry Venn
 Henry Venn (Clapham Sect) the elder (1725–1797), English evangelical minister
 Horace Venn (1892–1953), English cricketer
 John Venn (1834–1923), British logician and the inventor of Venn diagrams, son of Henry Venn the younger
 John Venn (academic) (died 1687), English academic administrator
 John Venn (politician) (1586–1650), English politician
 John Venn (priest) (1759–1813), one of the founders of the Church Missionary Society, son of Henry Venn
 John Archibald Venn (1883–1958), British economist
 Kath Venn (1926–2019), Australian politician
 Kim Venn, Canadian professor of physics and astronomy
 Kristin Venn (born 1994), Norwegian handball player
 Laurie Venn (born 1953), Australian racing cyclist
 Rebecca Venn, Canadian curler; see 2013 Saskatchewan Scotties Tournament of Hearts
 Richard Venn (died 1639), English merchant and Lord Mayor of London
 Richard Venn (priest), rector of St. Antholin's, London; see Thomas Rundle

Fictional characters
 Diggory Venn, in the 1878 Thomas Hardy novel The Return of the Native

Masculine given names